is a Japanese sociologist and philosopher. Outside Japan, he is best known as a social scientist, often mentioned in reference to sociological and philosophical research on otaku culture and popular Japanese animation series such as Ghost in the Shell: Stand Alone Complex.

Background 
Osawa received his Ph.D in Sociology from the University of Tokyo in 1990. His supervisor was Munesuke Mita. He is one of the most influential sociologists in Japan and a prolific author. He has taught at Chiba University and Kyoto University.

Works 
Osawa is known for proposing a form of body theory that is concerned with how our life-world is constructed, particularly the process that yields norm and meaning. He assumes that the coordination between more than two bodies, which includes physical objects, sustains all human activities. Such coordination, which Osawa called as "inter-bodily chain" is the basis of our experiences. In his view, the interaction of the bodies produces the transcendental agency that defines what is valid and invalid or appropriate and inappropriate.

The sociologist also labeled the period starting from 1995 onwards as the Age of Impossibility in contrast the Age of Virtuality (1970-1995). The former described a decline of totality in contemporary society while the latter, which was equated with virtuality, was an era when reality was relativized.

Osawa has contributed to the most influential Japanese postmodern journal , edited by Kojin Karatani and Akira Asada. He has also written essays for the Japanese arts and technology journal called InterCommunication.

See also
Munesuke Mita
Kojin Karatani
Shinji Miyadai
Hiroki Azuma

References

External links
 Masachi Osawa's Official Website 

Living people
Japanese philosophers
Japanese sociologists
University of Tokyo alumni
1958 births
Academic staff of Chiba University
Academic staff of Kyoto University